Yuliia Kolesnyk (born 27 August 1997) is a Ukrainian sprint canoeist.

She competed at the 2021 ICF Canoe Sprint World Championships, winning a bronze medal in the C-4 500 m distance.

References

External links

1997 births
Living people
Ukrainian female canoeists
ICF Canoe Sprint World Championships medalists in Canadian
21st-century Ukrainian women